Rear Admiral Oliver Francis Naquin, United States Navy (March 24, 1904 – November 13, 1989) was born in New Orleans, and was a 1925 graduate of the United States Naval Academy. He was one of 33 men rescued by the McCann Rescue Chamber when the submarine  sank in 240 feet of water during routine sea trials in the Atlantic Ocean off Portsmouth, New Hampshire on May 23, 1939, and was rescued in a two-day rescue operation.

USS Squalus disaster
Twenty-six men (one officer, Ensign Joseph H. Patterson; 23 enlisted men; and two civilian technicians, Donald M. Smith and Charles M. Wood) were trapped in a flooded aft compartment and died. The remaining 32 naval personnel and a third civilian, naval architect Harold C. Preble, spent up to 39 hours in the sunken vessel before they were brought to the surface by the McCann Rescue Chamber which was used for the first time. Survivors of the USS Squalus were brought up in four trips as the diving bell rode a cable attached to the forward escape hatch of the submarine. A naval board of inquiry concluded that “a mechanical failure in the operating gear of the engine induction valve,” had caused flooding of the aft compartment. The USS Squalus was later salvaged, repaired and returned to sea as the renamed , receiving credit for sinking seven enemy vessels in World War II.

World War II
Naquin also was a survivor of the attack on Pearl Harbor while aboard the battleship , which sank in shallow water after being struck a bomb and two torpedoes in the Japanese attack on December 7, 1941. During World War II, he served as navigator of the heavy cruiser  in the battles of the Coral Sea and Midway. At the Battle of Tassafaronga on November 30, 1942 the cruiser was struck by a Japanese torpedo, which detonated the ship's forward magazines and gasoline tanks and the ensuing explosion severed 150 ft of her bow forward of turret #2. The severed bow, including turret #1, swung around the port side and crushed several holes in the New Orleans''' hull before it sank at the stern and damaged the port inboard propeller. Naquin guided the ship to Tulagi Harbor, which was reached near daybreak on December 1, 1942 for repairs and was awarded a Bronze Star for his role in saving the vessel.

His first role as Port Director at Guam was to not inform Capt. Charles Butler McVay III of enemy submarine activity along the route from Guam to Leyte and to refuse a request for escort, making this the first time a cruiser had traveled the Philippine Sea unescorted. The trip was approximately 1,500 miles; when the USS Indianapolis sunk it was 300 miles from  land. The second role Naquin played was to not follow through on being notified of a distress call from a ship in the approximate area where the USS Indianapolis would be, even once he was made aware that the USS Indianapolis was seriously overdue. His justification was that it was Navy policy to confirm a distress call and his Office sent out a reply message but did not get a return message. The reason for this policy was that the Navy wanted to be sure that the call was not an enemy trap. There were many high-ranking officers who had knowledge of the route and schedule of the USS Indianapolis voyage from Tinian to Guam to Leyte and were anticipating word of the ship's arrival in Leyte. There are many scenarios where, under proper Navy procedure the survivors could have been found at least approximately 24 hours before they were, and as soon as twenty-four hours after the sinking of the ship, which would have been forty-eight hours earlier. They were not found until a pilot on routine patrol spotted them by accident approximately seventy-one hours after the incident. It took another two days for everybody to be rescued. The crew consisted of 1,196 young men in their late teens and early twenties. Approximately 300 went down with the ship and 317 survived, with approximately 550–600 lost at sea. The twenty-four- or forty-eight-hour difference would have saved hundreds of lives, and, of course, if there had been an escort with submarine detection capability, perhaps, all could have been saved.

Post-war
Naquin held several high staff positions after the war and was the chief naval officer in the Military Assistance Advisory Group in Britain, at his retirement on July 1, 1955 after a 34-year career in the Navy. He lived in Arlington, Virginia.

He died on November 13, 1989, at age 85, of pancreatic cancer at Andrews Air Force Base Hospital and was buried in Section 5 of Arlington National Cemetery.

References
Notes

Obituary, New York Times, November 15. 1989
Barrows, Nathaniel A. Blow All Ballast! The Story of the Squalus. New York: Dodd, Mead & Co, 1940. Department's Report on "Squalus" Disaster. Washington: U.S. G.P.O., 1939. 
Gray, Edwyn. Disasters of the Deep: A Comprehensive Survey of Submarine Accidents and Disasters. Annapolis, Md: Naval Institute Press, 2003. 
Naval Historical Center (U.S.). USS Squalus (SS-192) The Sinking, Rescue of Survivors, and Subsequent Salvage, 1939. Washington, D.C.: Naval Historical Center, 1998. http://www.history.navy.mil/faqs/faq99-1.htm
LaVO, Carl. Back from the Deep: The Strange Story of the Sister Subs Squalus and Sculpin. Annapolis, Md: Naval Institute Press, 1994.
Mariners' Museum (Newport News, Va.). Salvage of the Squalus: Clippings from Newspapers, May 25, 1939 – January 20, 1941. Newport News, Va: Mariners' Museum, 1942. 
Portsmouth Naval Shipyard (U.S.). Technical Report of the Salvage of U.S.S. Squalus. Portsmouth, N.H.: U.S. Navy Yard, 1939. Falcon (Salvage ship), and Albert R. Behnke. Log of Diving During Rescue and Salvage Operations of the USS Squalus: Diving Log of USS Falcon, 24 May 1939-12 September 1939. Kensington, Maryland: Reprinted by Undersea & Hyperbaric Medical Society, 2001
Maas, Peter. The Rescuer. New York: Harper & Row, 1967. Diving in the U.S. Navy a brief history. http://purl.access.gpo.gov/GPO/LPS88384
Maas, Peter. The Terrible Hours: The Man Behind the Greatest Submarine Rescue in History.'' New York: HarperCollins Publishers, 1999.

United States submarine commanders
United States Navy rear admirals (upper half)
United States Navy personnel of World War II
United States Naval Academy alumni
People from New Orleans
Deaths from pancreatic cancer
1904 births
1989 deaths
Burials at Arlington National Cemetery